West of Scotland may refer to:

West of Scotland (Scottish Parliament electoral region),  an electoral region of the Scottish Parliament
Informally, an area comprising Argyll, Ayrshire, Dunbartonshire, Lanarkshire, and Renfrewshire
West Central Scotland
West of Scotland F.C. 
West of Scotland Cricket Club
Seas west of Scotland

See also
West Scotland (Scottish Parliament electoral region)